The Farrier F-24, also called the Corsair F-24, is an American trailerable trimaran that was designed by Ian Farrier as a racer-cruiser and first built in 1991.

The Farrier F-24 design was developed into the Corsair 24 Mark II, also called the F-24 Mark II, in 1994, and the F-24 Sport Cruiser in 1994.

Production
The design was built by Corsair Marine in the United States, from 1991 to 1994, but it is now out of production.

Design
The Farrier F-24 is a recreational sailboat, built predominantly of fiberglass. It has a fractional sloop rig with a rotating mast. The hull and outriggers have nearly plumb stems and reverse transoms. The hull has a transom-hung rudder controlled by a tiller and a retractable daggerboard. It displaces  and carries no ballast.

See also
List of sailing boat types

Related development
Farrier F-22

References

Trimarans
1990s sailboat type designs
Sailing yachts
Trailer sailers
Sailboat type designs by Ian Farrier
Sailboat types built by Corsair Marine